, the International Union for Conservation of Nature (IUCN) has evaluated the conservation status of 280 fungus species.

Previously in the 2017-3 release, the IUCN evaluated the conservation status of 56 fungus species.  One subspecies, that of Pleurotus nebrodensis, also was evaluated but has since been removed.  At the time no subpopulations were evaluated. 

, the New Zealand Threat Classification System listed 1512 species and 39 subspecies of fungi, with 65 species considered Threatened.

IUCN listings
This is a complete list of fungus species and subspecies evaluated by the IUCN.

NZTCS listings

Nationally Critical
 Austrogaster novaezelandiae - One Location
 Berggrenia cyclospora - One Location
 Cantharellus elsae - One Location
 Chalciporus aurantiacus
 Chlorovibrissea bicolor - One Location
 Chlorovibrissea melanochlora - One Location
 Chlorovibrissea tasmanica - One Location
 Claustula fischeri K.M. Curtis, 1926 - Fischer’s egg, Data Poor, Stable, Threatened Overseas, One Location
 Colpoma nothofagi
 Cordierites acanthophora - One Location
 Dichomitus newhookii
 Ganoderma sp. “Awaroa” - (Pukatea bracket) Human Induced
 Gomphus dingleyae - One Location
 Gomphus novaezelandiae - One Location
 Gyroporus castaneus - One Location
 Hysterangium youngii - One Location
 Inonotus chondromyelus
 Lactarius maruiaensis - One Location
 Phallobata alba
 Phanerochaete citrina - One Location
 Phanerochaete corymbata - One Location
 Phanerochaete luteoaurantiaca - One Location
 Polyporus septosporus P.K. Buchanan & Ryvarden, 1998 - Septate-spored polypore, Data Poor, Threatened Overseas, One Location
 Puccinia embergeriae McKenzie & P.R. Johnst. ined. - Chatham Island sow thistle rust, Stable, One Location
 Puccinia freycinetiae - One Location
 Ramaria aureorhiza - One Location
 Ramaria avellaneovertex - One Location
 Ramaria basirobusta - One Location
 Ramaria junquilleovertex - One Location
 Ramaria piedmontiana - One Location
 Ramariopsis avellanea - One Location
 Ramariopsis avellaneoinversa - One Location
 Ramariopsis tortuosa - One Location
 Russula inquinata - Data Poor, One Location
 Russula littoralis - One Location
 Russula miniata - Data Poor, One Location
 Russula papakaiensis - Data Poor, One Location
 Russula pleurogena - One Location
 Russula solitaria - Data Poor, One Location
 Russula vivida McNabb, 1973 - Data Poor
 Sarcosoma orientale
 Squamanita squarrulosa - One Location
 Thaxterogaster cartilagineus - One Location
 Undescribed genus of Trichocomaceae - Data Poor
 Uredo chathamica - One Location
 Uredo salicorniae
 Volvariella surrecta - One Location
 Xylaria wellingtonensis - One Location
 Xylaria zealandica - One Location

Serious decline
 Melampsora novaezelandiae

Gradual Decline
 Diaporthe sp. 1 - Conservation Dependent, Human Induced
 Diaporthe sp. 2 - Conservation Dependent, Human Induced
 Glonium sp. - Conservation Dependent, Extreme Fluctuations
 Leucostoma sp. 1 - Conservation Dependent, Human Induced
 Leucostoma sp. 2 - Conservation Dependent, Human Induced
 Pestalotiopsis sp. - Conservation Dependent, Extreme Fluctuations
 Phomopsis sp. - Conservation Dependent, One Location
 Propolis desmoschoeni - Conservation Dependent, Extreme Fluctuations
 Seimatosporium sp. - Conservation Dependent, Extreme Fluctuations
 Truncatella sp. - Conservation Dependent, Extreme Fluctuations

Sparse
 Asterinella intensa
 Lophodermium kaikawakae
 Mycosphaerella sp.
 Patellaria sp.
 Phyllosticta sp. - Extreme Fluctuations

See also
 Conservation of fungi
 List of Chromista by conservation status
 Ophiocordyceps sinensis

References

Conservation status
Fungi